Alexander Topp (1814–1879) was a Scottish minister of the Free Church of Scotland who emigrated to Canada and twice served as Moderator of the General Assembly to the Presbyterian Church of Canada.

Life

He was born at Sheriffmill near Elgin on 1 April 1814 the second of three sons in a family of six. He was educated at Elgin Academy then studied Divinity at King's College, Aberdeen where he graduated MA in 1831. He was ordained by the Church of Scotland at the High Church in Elgin in 1838 having assisted at the church since 1836.

He left the established church in the Disruption of 1843 and created the Free High Church of Elgin. In 1852 he was translated to the Free Roxburgh Church in Edinburgh. In 1858 he emigrated to Canada to serve in the Knox Presbyterian Church in Toronto. He remained there until death.

In 1868 he was unanimously elected Moderator of the Canada Presbyterian Church. From 1871 to 1875 he worked on the union of the four presbyterian churches  to create the Presbyterian Church of Canada. He was Moderator of the new church in 1876.

He was a Governor of Knox College, Toronto. He was a joint founder of the Presbyterian College, Toronto and in 1871 helped to found the Manitoba College in Manitoba. From 1874 to 1879 he served on the management of the Toronto Home for Incurables. From 1866 to 1870 he served the Toronto Home of Industry.

He died in Toronto on 6 October 1879. He is buried in Mount Pleasant Cemetery, Toronto.

Family
In 1850 he married Jane Mortimer widow of John Clark both of Aberdeen. Their only child died in 1853.

References

1814 births
1879 deaths
People from Elgin, Moray
People educated at Elgin Academy, Moray
19th-century Ministers of the Free Church of Scotland
People from Old Toronto